The Museum of the Future (Arabic: متحف المستقبل) is an exhibition space for innovative and futuristic ideologies, services, and products. Located in the Financial District of Dubai, UAE, the Museum of the Future has three main elements: green hill, building, and void. Founded by the Dubai Future Foundation. It was set to open in 2021, but as of December of that year had yet to fully do so. The Government of the United Arab Emirates later opened the museum on 22 February 2022. The choice of the date was officially made because the 22nd of February 2022 is a palindrome date.

The goal of this museum is to promote technological development and innovation, especially in the fields of robotics and artificial intelligence (AI).

History
Mohammed bin Rashid Al Maktoum, ruler of Dubai and Vice President and Prime Minister of the UAE, announced on 4 March 2015 plans to establish the Museum of the Future after it was showcased in February 2015 during the Government Summit.

On 7 February 2016, Mohammed bin Rashid inaugurated the Museum of the Future exhibition as part of the World Government Summit 2016. On 24 April 2016, Mohammed bin Rashid launched 'Dubai Future Foundation'. Under the new structure, the Museum of the Future became a part of the Dubai Future Foundation.

On 10 February 2017 and 9 February 2018, the Museum of the future opened temporarily at Madinat Jumeirah during the World Government Summit.

On 22 February 2022, the Museum of the Future was officially opened at 7pm Dubai Time. The opening ceremony and the right to open the Museum were given to Sheikh Mohammed bin Rashid Al Maktoum; alongside Sheikh Hamdan bin Mohammed bin Rashid Al Maktoum, Crown Prince of Dubai, and Sheikh Maktoum bin Mohammed bin Rashid Al Maktoum.

Exhibitions
As part of the World Government Summit, the Museum of the Future has held several exhibitions since its inauguration in 2016. Each of the exhibitions had a different theme focused on the role of technology in the different sectors.

Mechanic Life
Held in October 2016, the Mechanic Life exhibition explored the idea of having sophisticated robots that understand emotions. It also focused on artificial intelligence and human augmentation.

Climate Change Reimagined: Dubai 2050
The exhibition, which was held in 2017, adopted a theme set in 2050 to explore how humanity could thrive by welcoming radical innovations and despite the impacts of global warming and climate change. It focused on the three key factors contributing to humanity’s ecological footprint, and these are urbanism, agriculture and global industry.

Hi I am AI
The Hi I am AI exhibition was held in 2018 to showcase how AI-powered buildings would serve humanity. It discussed several notions, including whether AI could be creative and what would humanity’s future be like in an AI era.

HUMANS 2.0
The sixth exhibition of the Museum of the Future was held in 2019, and it explored the concepts of human augmentation and focused on the human body and mind.

Concept
The Museum of the Future claims that it seeks to foster solutions to the challenges that future cities face, in addition to housing innovations and being a hub that brings researchers, designers, inventors and financiers under one roof.

The museum will host innovation labs dedicated to several sectors, including health, education, smart cities, energy and transport. It will also support and test new inventions in partnership with research institutes and universities.

Building structure
One of the world’s most complex structures, the Museum of the Future was designed by Killa Design architecture studio and engineered by Buro Happold. The building aims for a LEED Platinum rating in terms of its green rating.

The exterior façade of the building comprises windows that form an Arabic poem by Dubai's ruler about the emirate’s future. The words written on the Dubai Museum of the Future are 3 quotes from Sheikh Mohammed bin Rashid Al Maktoum, Vice President and Prime Minister of the United Arab Emirates are:

·      We won't live for hundreds of years, but we can create something that will last for hundreds of years.

·      The future will be for those who will be able to imagine, design and build it, the future does not wait, the future can be designed and built today.

·      The secret of the renewal of life, the development of civilization and the progress of humanity is in one word: innovation.

The Arabic calligraphy engraved quotes on the Museum of the Future in Dubai is written by Emirati artist Matar Bin Lahej.

This torus-shaped shell sits on top of the building and comprises 1,024 fire-retardant composite panels clad in stainless steel, and each of which has a unique 3D shape to create the Arabic script.

Killa Design and Buro Happold developed new parametric design and Building Information Modelling (BIM) tools, including a growth algorithm that employs digital means to grow the internal steel structure. Danem Engineering Works was one of the steel structure contractors for the project.

The museum has seven floors dedicated to different exhibitions. Three floors focus on outer space resource development, ecosystems and bioengineering, and health and wellbeing. The other floors showcase near-future technologies that address challenges in areas including health, water, food, transportation, and energy, while the last floor is dedicated to children.

Initiatives
On 30 June 2015, Dubai revealed plans to build the world's first fully functional 3D printed building, the "Office of The Future". The project is the first major initiative of the Museum of the Future.

On 17 February 2016, the Dubai Future Foundation announced the launch of the Global Blockchain Council to explore and discuss current and future applications, and organize transactions through the Blockchain platform.

On 28 March 2016, the Dubai Future Foundation launched the Mostaqbal Portal, an initiative to cover the latest findings of the technology and science sector on a daily basis by publishing studies, research findings, visual material and infographics in Arabic in simplified and easy-to-understand language.

References

External links
 

2022 establishments in the United Arab Emirates
Museums established in 2022
Museums in Dubai
Science museums in the United Arab Emirates
Technology museums
Futures studies organizations
Science and technology in the United Arab Emirates
Tourist attractions in Dubai